South Beach railway station was a railway station on the Transperth network. It was located on the Fremantle line, 22 kilometres from Perth station in South Fremantle.

History
On 22 October 1898, the Fremantle line was extended south from Fremantle to Robbs Jetty.

For the staging of the 1987 America's Cup, the existing narrow and standard gauge tracks were combined as one dual gauge line with three temporary stations erected, one of which was South Beach. Between October 1986 and February 1987, the Hotham Valley Railway operated a daily service on this section of the line with a W class steam locomotive as the Spinnaker Run. This was supplemented by Transperth special services. Having not been used since, the station was demolished in September 2018.

References

External links

Cockburn - Fremantle track layout SA Track & Signal
Gallery History of Western Australian Railways & Stations

Buildings and structures demolished in 2018
Disused railway stations in Western Australia
Fremantle line
Railway stations in Australia opened in 1986
Railway stations closed in 1987
1987 disestablishments in Australia